Hans Jørgen Riber (born 30 July 1964) is a Danish sailor. He competed in the men's 470 event at the 1992 Summer Olympics.

References

External links
 

1964 births
Living people
Danish male sailors (sport)
Olympic sailors of Denmark
Sailors at the 1992 Summer Olympics – 470
Place of birth missing (living people)